Khairi  is a small village in the Hisar district under the Uklanamandi constituency in Haryana, India.

Khairi was a part of the Pabra village. Khairi, Pabra, Kandul, Kinala & Faridpur are collectively called 'Panchgrami' & they are KUNDU clan majority villages. In 1805, Khairi separated from the Pabra village and became its own entity. Although the main source of employment remains agriculture, there is a good number working in the service sector (teachers, doctors, engineers) and other private sector jobs. Some people run sole proprietorship businesses like grocery shops. The literacy rate is almost 80% in the village. Population of Khairi is about 4000 & sex ratio is 950/1000.

After partition in 1947, Muslim Rajputs (Muhammad Usman s/o Abdul Rasheed with his wife Hakimman and sons Jumshid Ali (late), Karaamat Ali(late), Sodager Ali and moujdin(late))) migrated to Mahni sial, tehsil kabirwala, District Khanewal, Punjab, Pakistan. They have all the facilities such as electricity (1976), natural gas, and two Govt high schools - one for boys and other for girls.    

The Gram panchayat has restricted resources, therefore infrastructure development is minimal.
Shanti devi high school, Sun rise Sr sec school and Baba bilasgar public are private schools in Khairi. .

References

Villages in Hisar district